Idi Guz (also Romanized as Īdī Gūz; also known as Sefīd Khānī and Sefīd Khvānī) is a village in Kandovan Rural District, Kandovan District, Meyaneh County, East Azerbaijan Province, Iran. At the 2006 census, its population was 157, in 31 families.

References 

Populated places in Meyaneh County